Teddy Arundell (1873 in Devon – 5 November 1922, in London) was a British film actor of the silent era.

Selected filmography
 The Lyons Mail (1916)
 Justice (1917)
 Nelson (1918)
 The Swindler (1918)
 The Splendid Coward (1918)
 God's Good Man (1919)
 Mr. Wu (1919)
 The Elusive Pimpernel (1919)
 The Amateur Gentleman (1920)
 The Tavern Knight (1920)
 Bleak House (1920)
 Greatheart (1921)
 The Mystery of Mr. Bernard Brown (1921)
 The Four Just Men (1921)
 General John Regan (1921)
 The Amazing Partnership (1921)
 Kipps (1921)
 The River of Stars (1921)
 Cocaine (1922)
 A Lost Leader (1922)
 The Passionate Friends (1922)

References

External links

1922 deaths
English male film actors
English male silent film actors
20th-century English male actors
Male actors from Devon
1873 births